Mariia Kovtunovskaia (born 19 December 1988, Gorky, Soviet Union (now Nizhny Novgorod, Russia)) is a Russian water polo player. At the 2012 Summer Olympics, she competed for the Russia women's national water polo team in the women's event.

See also
 Russia women's Olympic water polo team records and statistics
 List of women's Olympic water polo tournament goalkeepers
 List of World Aquatics Championships medalists in water polo

References

External links
 

1988 births
Living people
Sportspeople from Nizhny Novgorod
Russian female water polo players
Water polo goalkeepers
Olympic water polo players of Russia
Water polo players at the 2012 Summer Olympics
World Aquatics Championships medalists in water polo
21st-century Russian women